Martin John Corry (12 December 1889 – 14 February 1979) was an Irish farmer and long-serving backbench Teachta Dála (TD) for Fianna Fáil. He represented various County Cork constituencies covering his farm near Glounthaune, east of Cork city. He was described by Michael Leahy, his IRA commandant as the Cork No 1 Brigade's 'Chief Executioner' and is believed to have been responsible for at least 27 killings, mostly in the neighbouring parish of Knockraha. He was a founder member of Fianna Fáil in 1926, and among its first TDs after the June 1927 general election. He was returned at every election until he stood down at the 1969 general election. 

Corry was active in farming issues, serving as Chairman of the Beet Growers' Association in the 1950s. In 1966, upon the resignation of Seán Lemass as Fianna Fáil leader and Taoiseach, Corry was among the Munster-based TDs who approached Jack Lynch to be a compromise candidate for the party leadership.

Early life
Corry was born on 12 December 1889 on 4 Victoria Road, Cork, to Martin Corry, a Royal Irish Constabulary sergeant originally from County Clare, and Julia Mary Walsh, of Cork. In 1901, the family was living on Blackrock Road. By 1911, after his father had retired from the RIC and taken up farming, the family were living in the townland of Monaparson, near Mourne Abbey, County Cork.

IRA activity
He was a member of the Mourneabbey Company of the Irish Volunteers. Corry was a captain in the 4th battalion Cork No. 1 Brigade of the Irish Republican Army during the Irish War of Independence (1919–1921). He took the anti-Treaty side in the Civil War (1922–1923) and was detained in Newbridge internment camp between December 1922 and January 1924. In 2007, it was reported that Corry's farm had been the suspected site of the execution and burial place of several people considered to be pro-British agents, spies, or informers. Among these was Michael Williams, an ex-Royal Irish Constabulary officer abducted by the IRA "Irregulars" on 15 June 1922 for his alleged role in the shooting dead in 1920 of Tomás Mac Curtain, the Sinn Féin Lord Mayor of Cork. Corry stated he executed 27 people during the War of Independence.

Dáil career
In a Dáil career of over forty years, Corry generally restricted himself to speaking on local issues affecting his constituents. In 1953, Corry lobbied unsuccessfully for the Faber-Castell factory planned for Fermoy to be relocated further south in his territory, to the chagrin of party colleagues in Fermoy.

Corry was a staunch advocate of Irish republicanism, strongly opposed to Partition, antipathetic to the United Kingdom, and sometimes bluntly outspoken within the Dáil chamber. In 1928, he criticised the Cumann na nGaedheal government's expenditure on the diplomatic corps, stating: "These salaries of £1,500 have to be paid so that they might squat like the nigger when he put on the black silk hat and the swallow-tail coat and went out and said he was an English gentleman." In 1930, he claimed the government had a shortage of priorities on the matter of Ireland's's finances, telling Denis Gorey: "When we see Ministers coming here and providing £300,000 for the dole for the unemployed, one wonders whether the Government is fit to govern even a tribe of African niggers. I do not believe they are"; to which Gorey responded: "Do not be abusing your relations". Corry's opposition to the Blueshirts in the early 1930s provoked an attempt to burn down his house. 

In the 1938 debate on the Anglo-Irish Trade Agreement which ceded the Treaty Ports to the Irish state, Corry expressed regret that Northern Ireland remained excluded, suggesting: "I personally am in favour of storing up sufficient poison gas, so that when you get the wind in the right direction you can start at the Border and let it travel, and follow it." In a 1942 debate on exporting food to Great Britain during World War II, Corry remarked about food shortages there that "They have no more rabbits to get, and now they are on the crows", and "I would not like to see too many crows going out to feed them. I think the crows are too good for them". Patrick Giles called Corry a "bounder", and Alfie Byrne persisted in demanding an apology for the "unchristian" comments to the point of himself being suspended from the chamber.

According to Dan Keating, Corry led a group of TDs who persuaded Taoiseach Éamon de Valera to exercise clemency when Tomás Óg Mac Curtain was sentenced to death in 1940 for shooting dead a Garda. Tomás Óg Mac Curtain was an IRA member and the son of the 1920 Lord Mayor.

In 1948 and again in 1950, Corry proposed a Private member's bill to allow less restricted Sunday opening of public houses in rural areas, arguing the existing licensing law was widely flouted. The bill was withdrawn after ministerial assurance of an imminent Government-sponsored licensing bill (which did not materialise) and in the face of public condemnation from members of the Catholic hierarchy.

At the 1957 general election he achieved the rare feat of being elected on the first count without a surplus.

County councillor
Corry was a member of Cork County Council, representing the Cobh electoral area, from 1924 till after 1970. He often clashed with Philip Monahan, the first county manager. Corry regarded the ability of the manager, an appointed bureaucrat, to overrule the elected Council as an affront to democracy, "the tail wagging the dog", reducing councillors to being "a cloak for his dictatorship". Corry was Chairman of the Council (a position later retitled Mayor) for four years in the 1960s: 1962–1963, 1964–1965, 1967–1969. In this role in 1968 he inaugurated Cork County Hall, the tallest building in the Republic of Ireland at the time.

Later life
Corry did not stand in the June 1969 general election. In May 1969, Tom Fitzpatrick had read a letter under Dáil privilege; allegedly written by Corry in 1955, it demanded £200 in cash from an engineering firm for securing a favourable County Council vote. It was later alleged that Corry was compelled to stand down to avoid the allegation embarrassing the party.

In November 1969, Corry was appointed a director of Comhlucht Siúicre Éireann Teoranta, the national sugar company, which was then a state-sponsored body.

On 26 June 1920 Corry married Margaret Fenton, a member of Cumann na mBan. They had two sons and one daughter. He died on 14 February 1979 at the regional hospital, Wilton, Cork.

According to the Dictionary of Irish Biography: "Although widely regarded as a buffoon, Corry was more able and more sinister than he appears from his outbursts in the dáil record; he represented a psychotic streak in the independence struggle and post-independence politics, widely perceived though seldom described in print."

References

1889 births
1977 deaths
Local councillors in County Cork
Irish Republican Army (1919–1922) members
Members of the 5th Dáil
Members of the 6th Dáil
Members of the 7th Dáil
Members of the 8th Dáil
Members of the 9th Dáil
Members of the 10th Dáil
Members of the 11th Dáil
Members of the 12th Dáil
Members of the 13th Dáil
Members of the 14th Dáil
Members of the 15th Dáil
Members of the 16th Dáil
Members of the 17th Dáil
Members of the 18th Dáil
Fianna Fáil TDs
Irish farmers